Double first class may refer to:
British undergraduate degree classification#Variations of First Class honours, a classification of honours in the British undergraduate education
Double First Class University Plan, a university development plan implemented in China to create first class universities and disciplines